I Wish You a Merry Christmas was a long-playing vinyl album of Christmas themed songs recorded by Bing Crosby for his own company, Project Records, and issued by Warner Bros. (W-1484) in 1962.

The tracks were arranged by Bob Thompson, Peter Matz and Jack Halloran and each conducted the orchestra for their own arrangements.  The musical accompaniment was recorded on 23 and 25 July 1962 and Crosby over-dubbed his vocals on October 5, 1962.

The album was re-released by Capitol in 1977 (on LP) and again in 1988 (on CD) as Bing Crosby's Christmas Classics, with one track – "Pat-a-Pan/ While Shepherds Watched Their Sheep" – omitted. All the songs from the original album were included on a 1998 EMI CD called Winter Wonderland in the UK and on an updated 2006 Capitol CD of Bing Crosby's Christmas Classics in the US.

Reception
Billboard reviewed I Wish You a Merry Christmas in November 1962, saying, "Crosby is a perennial holiday seller, and this LP should prove an important Christmas item for all dealers. The Crosby touch is everywhere evident and the material is drawn from the great Christmas catalog. Chorus and orchestra assist der Bingle on such Christmas standards as "Winter Wonderland", "Hark the Herald Angels Sing" and "Have Yourself a Merry Little Christmas"."

Warners Bros. Records took out a full-page ad advertising the album in Billboard emphasizing that the album was newly recorded. The same magazine wrote in its Nov. 24, 1962, edition: "So far only one Christmas album has really taken off. This is 'The Glorious Sound of Christmas' with the Philadelphia Orchestra and the Mormon Tabernacle Choir. However, a new Bing Crosby Christmas album on Warner Bros. is starting to move, and Bing could add another Christmas best seller to his long list with this one."

In 1965, I Wish You a Merry Christmas ranked 40th on the Billboard list of that year's 60 best-selling Christmas albums. Crosby's Decca compilation Merry Christmas ranked fourth on the same list, and he held four of the 30 spots on that year's list of best-selling Christmas singles, as well.

Track listing

References 

1962 Christmas albums
Bing Crosby albums
Christmas albums by American artists
Albums arranged by Bob Thompson (musician)
Albums arranged by Peter Matz
Warner Records albums
Pop Christmas albums